Many a true word is spoken in jest is an adage, aphorism or proverb.

James Joyce combined this sentiment with the similar adage of in vino veritas to coin the phrase in risu veritas (in laughter, truth).

History
A version of this appears in the Prologue to "The Cook's Tale" (written in 1390) by Geoffrey Chaucer: "Ful ofte in game a sooth I have herd saye!".

An early print appearance of the most familiar form of this aphorism was in Volume VII of the Roxburghe Ballads, where it appears in the prologue to The Merry Man's Resolution, or A London Frollick. The ballad purportedly goes back to the 17th century, but the introductory verse was probably written by the editor of the collection Joseph Woodfall Ebsworth:

References

Adages
English proverbs